The Army Officers Training School, Bahtoo (abbreviated OTS) is an officer candidate school for the Myanmar Army located in Bahtoo Station, Shan State, Myanmar. OTS trains army warrant officers and non-commissioned officers, and is one of the country's main institutions for training army officers, along with the Defence Services Academy (DSA). Coursework at OTS typically spans nine months, and graduating cadets receive army commissions. OTS cadets generally have more experience in civilian life than other counterparts.

History 
The predecessor to the OTS was founded in Mingaladon Township, Rangoon (now Yangon) by the Imperial Japanese Army on 20 August 1942, becoming the first military training school in the country. After achieving independence in 1948, Myanmar's military established OTS in Maymyo (now Pyin Oo Lwin), near Mandalay. OTS was relocated to Bahtoo Station in Shan State, to make way for the Defence Services Academy, which would become the country's premier military academy. Since 1988, OTS has largely admitted cadets who have already earned undergraduate degrees. Political observers have noted long-standing power struggles between OTS and DSA. In 2016, 7% (4) of the military-appointed delegates to the Amyotha Hluttaw, the upper house of Myanmar's national legislature were OTS graduates, while none of the military-appointed delegates to the Pyithu Hluttaw, the lower house of Myanmar's national legislature were OTS graduates.

Notable alumni 
 Kyi Maung, 1st intake
 Tin Oo, 3rd intake
 Than Shwe, 9th intake
 Khin Nyunt, 25th intake
 Sein Win, 54th intake
 Teza Kyaw, 73rd intake
 Ye Win Oo, 77th intake
 Toe Yi, 77th intake

References 

Universities and colleges in Shan State
Military academies of Myanmar
Educational institutions established in 1942
1942 establishments in Burma
Schools in Myanmar